Tomás Domingo Muñiz Souffront (August 4, 1900 – September 9, 1963) was a well known Puerto Rican radio and television producer. He is sometimes respectfully called by the general public in Puerto Rico as Don Tomás Muñiz, to differentiate him from his namesake and son, Tommy Muñiz

As a young man, Tomás Muñiz worked as a real estate agent, and later as an advertising copy writer -and later executive- of the West Indies Advertising Company (WIAC). He later produced radio shows and administered the agency's radio station, WIAC-AM in San Juan. He was one of the first persons to give José Miguel Agrelot work. He also worked with a large number of other entertainers.

His son, Lucas Tomás Muñiz, or Tommy Jr., later on became owner of  Teleluz, a major competitor of WAPA-TV and Canal 2.

Tomás Muñiz was the patriarch of a show business family: one of his seven children, Tommy, is a media legend in Puerto Rico, his grandson Rafo Muñiz, is also an actor and television producer and music promoter. Yet another grandson, Pedro Muñiz, starred as the father in the 1989 highly acclaimed television sitcom Maripili which he also produced (521 episodes), he is also a film producer.  Son Tommy Muñiz Jr. also produced and starred in the only Puerto Rican film ever to be nominated for an Oscar, a 1989 film titled Lo que le Pasó a Santiago ("What happened to Santiago").

See also
List of Puerto Ricans

References

1900 births
1965 deaths
People from Cabo Rojo, Puerto Rico
Puerto Rican radio producers
Puerto Rican television producers
20th-century American businesspeople